North Carolina's 83rd House district is one of 120 districts in the North Carolina House of Representatives. It has been represented by Republican Kevin Crutchfield since 2023.

Geography
Since 2023, the district has included parts of Rowan and Cabarrus counties. The district overlaps with the 33rd, 34th, and 35th Senate districts.

District officeholders

Election results

2022

2020

2018

2016

2014

2012

2010

2008

2006

2004

2002

2000

References

North Carolina House districts
Rowan County, North Carolina
Cabarrus County, North Carolina